Steven Mennoh (born 5 June 1984) is a Liberian football midfielder.

References

1984 births
Living people
Liberian footballers
Liberia international footballers
LPRC Oilers players
Indonesian Premier Division players
Indonesian Premier League players
Semen Padang F.C. players
Sriwijaya F.C. players
Persita Tangerang players
Persipasi Bekasi players
Persiraja Banda Aceh players
Persepam Madura Utama players
PSM Makassar players
Association football midfielders
Liberian expatriate footballers
Expatriate footballers in Indonesia
Liberian expatriate sportspeople in Indonesia